James Frederick Lintott (born 29 March 1886 in Wallington, died 21 April 1963 in Croydon) was a British athlete.  He competed in the 1908 Summer Olympics in London.

Career
Lintott placed second in his semifinal heat of the 800 metres, not advancing to the final.  He stayed close to winner Mel Sheppard, finishing at 1:58.8 to Sheppard's 1:58.0 before the American runner went on to break the world record in winning the gold medal in the final.

References

Sources
 
 
 
 

1886 births
1963 deaths
Athletes (track and field) at the 1908 Summer Olympics
Olympic athletes of Great Britain
English male middle-distance runners
People from Wallington, London
Athletes from London